Yi Pei Chun is a village in Tsuen Wan District, Hong Kong.

Administration
Yi Pei Chun is a recognized village under the New Territories Small House Policy.

References

External links
 Delineation of area of existing village Yi Pei Chun (Tsuen Wan) for election of resident representative (2019 to 2022)

Villages in Tsuen Wan District, Hong Kong